Likhu is a Gaunpalika and former village development committee in Nuwakot District in Bagmati Province of central Nepal. At the time of the 1991 Nepal census it had a population of 2549 people living in 499 individual households.

References

External links
UN map of the municipalities of Nuwakot District

Populated places in Nuwakot District
Rural municipalities in Nuwakot District
Rural municipalities of Nepal established in 2017